Litiopidae, common name litiopids, is a family of small sea snails, marine gastropod molluscs in the clade Sorbeoconcha.

According to the taxonomy of the Gastropoda by Bouchet & Rocroi (2005) the family Litiopidae has no subfamilies.

Genera
Genera within the family Litiopidae include:
 Alaba H. Adams & A. Adams, 1853
 † Dalliella Cossmann, 1895 
 Diffalaba Iredale, 1936
 Gibborissoa Cossmann in Sacco, 1899
 Gibborissoia Sacco, 1895
 † Ipunina Nielsen & Frassinetti, 2008 
 Litiopa Rang, 1829 - the type genus of the family Litiopidae
 Litiopa melanostoma (Rang, 1829)
 † Litiopella Bandel & Kiel, 2000
 Litiopella schoeningi Bandel & Kiel, 2000 - from Cretaceous
 Obstopalia Iredale, 1936
 Styliferina Adams, 1860
Genera brought into synonymy
 Abaconia Clench, 1938: synonym of Litiopa Rang, 1829
 Australaba Laseron, 1956: synonym of Alaba H. Adams & A. Adams, 1853
 Bombyxinus Bélanger in Lesson, 1834: synonym of Litiopa Rang, 1829
 Dialessa Iredale, 1955: synonym of Styliferina A. Adams, 1860
 Gibborissoa Cossmann, 1921: synonym of Gibborissoia Sacco, 1895
 Macertexta Laseron, 1955: synonym of Styliferina A. Adams, 1860
 Pseudobittium Dautzenberg, 1890: synonym of Alaba H. Adams & A. Adams, 1853
 Touzinia Cossmann, 1916 †: synonym of Gibborissoia Sacco, 1895

References

External links 
 ITIS info

 
Taxa named by John Edward Gray